Herec (English: Actor) is a Czech drama television series directed by Peter Bebjak. It is set in 1950s Czechoslovakia.

The title role in the series was played by Jan Cina, who represents the young actor Stanislav Láník. Láník finds himself in a difficult life situation. State Security takes advantage of his homosexuality and offers him cooperation: Láník becomes bait for compromitation of influential figures which gives him acting opportunities. Jenovéfa Boková, Emília Vášáryová, Martin Finger or Adrian Jastraban also starred in the series.

The three-part series was broadcast every Sunday evening from 11 October to 25 October 2020, on the ČT1 channel.

Cast
Jan Cina as Standa Láník
Jenovéfa Boková as Anežka Láníková, Standa's sister
Emília Vášáryová as Božena Hrubá, Standa's and Anežka's grandmother
Martin Finger as captain Jindřich Korčák, StB officer
Adrian Jastraban as Karel Štěpánský, landlord and communist
Jan Nedbal as Zdeněk Špork, Anežka's fiancée
Luboš Veselý as profefsor Viktor Hél
Pavel Batěk as colonel Vladimír Kempný
Elizaveta Maximová as Marta Švarcová, actress
Judit Bárdos as Eva Doležalová, amateur actress
Alexander Bárta as Daneš
Julius Oračko as Farkaš
Vasil Fridrich as head Vaněk
Jevgenij Libezňuk as colonel Blochin
Lukáš Latinák as director Pasák
Dana Černá as secretary
Jiří Šimek as Karel Semerád

References 

Czech drama television series
2020 Czech television series debuts
Czech Television original programming
Czech LGBT-related television shows
Czech Lion Awards winners (television series)
Czech television miniseries